The European Short Course Swimming Championships 2008 took place in Rijeka, Croatia from Thursday 11 to Sunday 14 December 2008.

Medal table

Medal summary
Legend:
 WR = World record
 ER = European record
 CR = Championships record

Men's events

Women's events

See also
2008 in swimming

References 

 Omega Timing Results

External links 
 Official Site
 Swim Rankings Results
 Results book

European Short Course Swimming Championships, 2008
Swimming
2008
International sports competitions hosted by Croatia
Sport in Rijeka
December 2008 sports events in Europe